The Bagmati River flows through the Kathmandu valley of Nepal, separating the cities of Kathmandu from Patan, before flowing through Madesh Province of southern Nepal and joins the Kamla River in the Indian state of Bihar. It is considered holy by both Hindus and Buddhists. A number of Hindu temples are located on its banks.

The importance of Bagmati river also lies in the fact that Hindus are cremated on the banks of this holy river, and Kirants are buried in the hills by its side. According to the Nepalese Hindu tradition, the dead body must be dipped three times into the Bagmati river before cremation, so that the reincarnation cycle may be ended. The chief mourner (usually the first son) who lights the funeral pyre must take a holy river-water bath immediately after cremation. Many relatives who join the funeral procession also take a bath in the river or sprinkle the holy water on their bodies at the end of cremation. It is believed that the Bagmati river purifies people spiritually.

History
The Bagmati River is considered the source of Nepalese civilization and urbanization. The river has been mentioned as Vaggumuda in Vinaya Pitaka and Nandabagga. It has also been mentioned as Bahumati in Battha Suttanta of Majjhima Nikaya. An inscription dated AD 477 describes the river as Bagvati parpradeshe and subsequently also in the Gopalraj Vanshavali.

Geography

The basin of the Bagmati river, including the Kathmandu valley, lies between the much larger Gandaki basin to the west and the Koshi basin to the east. These adjacent basins extend north of the main Himalayan range and cross it in tremendous gorges, in fact, the Arun tributary of the Koshi extends far into Tibet. The smaller Bagmati rises some distance south of the Himalayas. Without glacial sources, its flow is more dependent on rainfall, becoming very low during the hot season (April to early June), then peaking during the monsoon season (mid-June to mid-August). In these respects, the Bagmati system resembles the (West) Rapti system lying between the Gandaki basin and the Karnali basin in the far west of Nepal.

The Bagmati originates where three headwater streams converge at Bāghdwār Falls, where the water flows out through a gargoyle shaped like a tiger's mouth, situated in Shivpuri Nagarjun National Park near Sundarijal in Nepal . Here the Bagmati is wide and swift with a high load of suspended solids, giving it a grey appearance. The river flows southwest about  through terraced rice fields in the Kathmandu Valley.

Resistant rock strata interrupt the flow in places, including at Pashupatinath Temple. Beyond the temple, the river flows south until joined by the larger west-flowing Monahara River, then turns west itself. After entering Kathmandu's urban area more tributaries enter: relatively unpolluted Dhobī Kholā and sewage-laden Tukucha Khola. Then the river bends south and the Bishnumati enters from the right at Teku Dovan. It flows south past the Nagarjun Hill, Swayambhu Stupa and Durbar Square in Kathmandu. As it passes the centre of Kathmandu, this tributary becomes heavily polluted and choked with trash.

Flowing generally south although with many curves, the Bagmati reaches the edge of the Kathmandu valley and enters Chobhar gorge near the Dakshinkali temple complex. The Chobhar gorge cuts through the Mahabharat range, also called the Lesser Himalaya. This  range is the southern limit of the "middle hills" across Nepal, an important cultural boundary between distinctive Nepali and more Indian cultures and languages, as well as a major geological feature. The Bagmati also crosses the lower Sivalik Hills before reaching the Terai, then crosses into India at Bairgania. It flows across the districts Darbhanga, Sitamarhi, Sheohar, Muzaffarpur and Khagaria in Bihar. It meets River Kamala at Jagmohra Village of Samastipur. However, in past the river had a different course and used to drain directly into the Ganges. In Swasthani Bratakatha of the Skanda Purana, Bagmati's present northern tributary was regarded as main channel called Sāli river which was a tributary of Gandaki and it is obvious since Manohara river, the present day Sali river, is larger than Bagmati at their confluence.

Pollution

The Bagmati River contains large amounts of untreated sewage, and large levels of pollution of the river exist due primarily to the region's large population. Many residents in Kathmandu empty their personal garbage and waste into the river. In particular the Hanumante Khola, Dhobī Kholā, Tukucha Khola and Bishnumati are the most polluted. Attempts are being made to monitor the Bagmati river system and restore its cleanliness. These include "pollution loads modification, flow augmentation and placement of weirs at critical locations".

On 18 May 2013, under the initiative of then chief secretary Leela Mani Poudyal, the Bagmati Mega Clean-Up Campaign was started. Every Saturday, personnels of the Nepal Army and Nepal Police, along with the general public, gather to clean the waste and sewage from the river. The Friends of the Bagmati is an organisation set up in November 2000. According to its website, its aim is "to reverse the degradation of the Bagmati river." In 2014, the Bagmati river was claimed to be "almost pure" after a long effort of 14 years.

Flood
There is no effect of flood in most of the areas that it touches, but it has caused widespread sufferings to the people in Terai and northern districts of Bihar. The worst destruction by the river were seen in 1993. Poor water management, lack of proper weather forecasting and awareness were the main cause of mass destruction.

Shrines

Gokarneshwor – Gokarneshwor Mahadev temple stands the banks of the Bagmati, built in 1582. In late August or early September, people go to this temple to bathe and make offerings in honor of their fathers, living or dead, on a day called Gokarna Aunsi also known as "Kuse Aunsi" (worshipping for the eternal peace of Father).
Guhyeshwari Temple – Guhyeshwari Temple, the temple of Guhyeshwari Devi, lies about 1 km east of Pashupatinath Temple on the banks of the Bagmati. The temple's name originates from the Sanskrit words Guhya (secret) and Ishwari (goddess). In Lalitha Sahasranama, the 707th name of Goddess is mentioned as Guhyarupini (the form of goddess is beyond human perception and is secret. Another argument is that it is the secret 16th syllable of the Shodashi Mantra) (LS 137th verse: Sarasvati shastramayi| Guhaamba guhyaruupini||). It is believed that parts of Sati Devi's corpse fell in different region when Shiva took it and roamed around the world in sorrow.
Pashupatinath Temple – The Pashupatinath Temple, dedicated to Shiva, stands on an outcrop above the river north of Kathmandu. It is considered to be one of the holy places of Hinduism.
Koteshwor Mahadev – Koteshwor Mahadev temple at Koteshwor is also a major holy place located in bank of Bagmati. According to a popular legend, the Shiva Lingam here is believed to be one of the 64 sacred Shiva Lingams.
Shankhamul – Near the Koteshwor Mahadev temple is a place known as Shankhamul. Shankhamul is one of the twelve “most-sacred” confluences in the Kathmandu valley as defined in the numerous chronicles that document the history and legends about the Kathmandu valley. At Shankhamul, the Bagmati river that flows south from the Pashupati temple complex, and all the rivers that flow from the eastern part of the valley including the Manohara river merge.
Kalmochan Temple – Kalmochan temple, dedicated to the Hindu god Lord Vishnu the preserver, was a part of the Thapathali Durbar complex in bank of Bagmati river. It was built in the early 18th century. The temple was built by Jung Bahadur Rana in Moghul Kathmandu-Gothic architecture style and has Mughal art and Nepali art. Also known as Janga Hiranya Hemnarayan Mandir, it is located at Kalmochan Ghāt in Thapathali.
Tripureshwor Temple –  The temple of Tripureshwor Mahadev near Kalmochan Ghāt, is the largest temple in Kathmandu valley, built by Lalit Tripura Sundari Devi in the nineteenth century (around 1875 B.S). It has three roofs—the upper two crafted of metal, while the bottom one is of baked terracota—and sits on a raised platform. The temple was made in the memory of her husband, King Rana Bahadur Shah for his eternal bliss and for the goodwill of her nation. It was probably the last major temple in the tiered style.
Pachali Bhairav – Established by Lichhavi king Gunakamadev (AD 924-1008), the god is very much associated with the founding of Kathmandu, because it was King Gunakamadev who is traditionally believed to have founded both the city and the festival of Bhairav which is located in the bank of Bagmati river.
Teku Dovan – One of the 12 sacred Tirthas in the Kathmandu valley, the ghāts along Gyan Tirtha, at the confluence of Bagmati and Bishnumati, are places for ritual bathing and cremation at or near rivers.
Jal Binayak Temple – Jal Binayak Temple is a temple of Ganesh, located in the Chobhar. The Jal Binayak Temple is the one of the most important Ganesh shrine in Kathmandu region, and is one of the four Binayak temples of the Kathmandu valley.

Notes

References

Bibliography

 .

 .
 .

External links

 Friends of the Bagmati
 Illegal Capture of Bagmati River Banks
 Religious story of Bagmati River

Rivers of Bagmati Province
Newar
Rivers of Bihar
International rivers of Asia
Rivers of India
Rivers of Madhesh Province